Eswar may refer to the following people:

Eswar Prasad (born 1965), Indian economist
Naresh Eswar, Indian film and television actor
Theni Eswar, Indian cinematographer

See also
Eswars

Indian masculine given names